Route 11 is a  north-south highway located on the Avalon Peninsula of the island of Newfoundland in the Canadian province of Newfoundland and Labrador. It connects the town of Petty Harbour-Maddox Cove with Goulds and St. John's

Route description

Route 11 begins as Petty Harbour Road in Goulds at an intersection with Route 10. It heads east up a narrow valley through neighbourhoods to leave Goulds and cross over a lake and wind its way through some mountains. The highway passes by Petty Harbour Generating Station before entering Petty Harbour-Maddox Cove. Route 11 passes through some neighbourhoods before entering downtown Petty Harbour and turning north along Main Road. It crosses over a creek before winding its way along some coastal cliffs. The highway then passes through the Maddox Cove portion of town before leaving Petty Harbour-Maddox Cove as Maddox Cove Road. Route 11 heads straight through rural wooded areas for several kilometres as it gains some elevation before coming to an intersection with Blackhead Road, with Route 11 turning west on that road. Blackhead Road continues east beyond this point to the community of Blackhead and Cape Spear. Route 11 continues northwest through rural areas for several kilometres to enter St. John's, where it winds its way through neighbourhoods for a few kilometres. It then makes a steep descent as it negotiates some sharp switchbacks to cross under Route 2 (Pitts Memorial Drive). The highway has an intersection with Southside Drive at the bottom of the hill before crossing a river and coming to an end at an intersection with Water Street.

Major intersections

Attractions along Route 11
 
Petty Harbour Generating Station
Cape Spear

See also
 
List of highways numbered 11

References

011
Streets in St. John's, Newfoundland and Labrador